The 1959 North Dakota State Bison football team was an American football team that represented North Dakota State University during the 1959 NCAA College Division football season as a member of the North Central Conference. In their third year under head coach Bob Danielson, the team compiled a 4–4–1 record.

Schedule

References

North Dakota State
North Dakota State Bison football seasons
North Dakota State Bison football